The 1970 Israel Super Cup was the second Israel Super Cup (seventh, including unofficial matches, as the competition wasn't played within the Israel Football Association in its first 5 editions, until 1969), an annual Israeli football match played between the winners of the previous season's Top Division and Israel State Cup. 

The match was played between Maccabi Tel Aviv, champions of the 1969–70 Liga Leumit and Hapoel Tel Aviv, runners-up in the league, as Maccabi Tel Aviv also won the 1969–70 Israel State Cup. Since Maccabi Tel Aviv won the previous season's double, the cup was officially designated as "The Liga Leumit Cup".

The match was due to be played on 14 October 1970, but was postponed due to weather conditions, and was held a week later. At the match, played at Bloomfield Stadium, Hapoel Tel Aviv won 2–1.

Match details

References

1970
Super Cup
Super Cup 1970
Super Cup 1970
Israel Super Cup matches